Town & Witherell were two American silversmiths in Montpelier, Vermont, who collaborated between 1838 and 1845.

Ira Strong Towne was born March 3, 1810, and died September 19, 1902.  His apprentice Elijah Bailey Witherell was born March 15, 1817, and died before April 26, 1849).

References 
 Vermont clock and watchmakers, silversmiths, and jewelers, 1778–1878, Lilian Baker Carlisle, distributed by The Stinehour Press, Lunenburg, Vt., 1970, page 275.
 The History of the Town of Montpelier, Including that of the Town of East Montpelier, for the First One Hundred and Two Years..., Abby Maria Hemenway, Miss A. M. Hemenway, 1882, page 279.
 The Antiques Journal, Volume 32, Babka Publishing Company, 1977.
 "Ira Strong Towne", American Silversmiths.
 "Elijah Bailey Witherell", American Silversmiths.
 "Ira Strong Town", Online Encyclopedia of Silver Marks, Hallmarks, and Makers' Marks.

American silversmiths